Laurence Hutton (August 8, 1843 – June 10, 1904) was an American essayist and critic.

Biography
Hutton was born in New York City on August 8, 1843, and educated privately there. He was an inveterate traveler and for about 20 years spent his summers abroad. From about 1870 he contributed continually to periodicals. He was the dramatic critic of the New York Evening Mail from 1872 to 1874. From 1886 to 1898 he was the literary editor of Harper's Magazine. He was one of the organizers of the Authors' Club and of the International Copyright League, and was a member of the Players' Club, the Princeton Club, and the Nassau Club. An ardent collector of literary curiosities, his collections are of remarkable interest. In 1892 he received the degree of A.M. from Yale University and an honorary Master of Art degree from Princeton University in 1897. From 1901 until his death in 1904, he was a lecturer of English at Princeton.

Hutton died of pneumonia in New York City in 1904.  He left a collection of papers (Laurence Hutton Papers), 801 rare books, and a collection of death masks to the Princeton University Library. After his death, his friend Samuel Elliott donated $2,500 in his memory to endow the Laurence Hutton Prize, awarded annually to the top student in the Princeton University Department of History.

Death mask collection
According to Princeton University, Hutton's collection of life and death masks contains about 100 masks and is the largest of its kind in the United States. Frank Weitenkampf quotes Hutton and the Epoch magazine on its genesis:

Princeton maintains an online repository of death-mask images from the collection: "Laurence Hutton Collection of Life and Death Mask, A Pictorial Guide by John Delaney".

Works
His writings on dramatic subjects include:  
 Plays and Players (1875)  
 Curiosities of the American Stage (1891)  
 Memoir of Edwin Booth (1893)  
 with Brander Matthews, Actors and Actresses of Great Britain and of the United States (1886–87)
 A Boy I Knew (1899)

He edited the American Actor Series (1881–82) and published a group of delightful literary guidebooks, including:  
 Literary Landmarks of London (1887)  
 Edinburgh (1892)  
 Jerusalem (1895)  
 Venice (1896)  
 Florence (1897)  
 Rome (1897)  
 Literary Landmarks of the Scottish Universities (1904)

Other works:
 Portraits in Plaster, from the Collection of Laurence Hutton, Harper & Brothers, New York (1894)

References

Further reading
 Moore, Isabel (1905). Talks in a Library with Laurence Hutton. New York: G.P. Putnam's Sons.
 Wood, M.E. (1905). Laurence and Eleanor Hutton: Their Books of Association. New York: Privately Printed.

External links

 
 
 
 Works by Laurence Hutton at Hathi Trust
  

American essayists
Writers from New York City
1843 births
1904 deaths